Sing the Sorrow is the sixth studio album by American rock band AFI. Recorded at Cello Studios in Los Angeles, California between 2002 and 2003, the album was produced by Jerry Finn and Butch Vig.

Sing the Sorrow received positive reviews from music critics, who praised its melodies and musicianship, as well as its mature sound in comparison to the band's previous material. The album sold 96,000 copies in its first week of release in the United States, reaching number 5 on the Billboard 200, and also charted in Canada and the United Kingdom. It has since been certified Platinum by the Recording Industry Association of America (RIAA), as well as being certified Platinum in Canada. The album was supported by three singles: "Girl's Not Grey", "The Leaving Song Pt. II" and "Silver and Cold", which have since successfully charted within the Alternative Songs and Rock Songs charts.

Music and lyrics 
Musically, Sing the Sorrow is a departure from the hardcore punk and horror punk genres featured in the band's previous material. The album features elements of hardcore punk, post-hardcore, alternative rock, gothic rock, and emo. More experimental than previous AFI albums, Sing the Sorrow includes instruments other than guitar, bass and drums, such as piano and strings. Lyrically, the album is darker and more poetic than the band's previous material. The opening track features some electronic programming from Jade Puget. A hidden song is included, which leads into a spoken word poem accompanied by piano keys and distorted synth sounds.

Artwork and liner notes 
Sing the Sorrow was released with three different covers, featuring different colors for the text, logo, and iconography. The colors were red, silver and black. The original cover features red artwork. Several of the first pressings in the United States and United Kingdom featured the silver cover, but the pressings are now rare and out of print, although the digital version of Sing the Sorrow among iTunes still features the silver artwork. The black cover was solely available at performing shows within the United States tour following the album's release, and through the official fan club's online store as well. The black cover is now rare and out of print, with only 2,500 copies in circulation.

International versions of the album use different artwork on the album label. Often contain a picture of an inverted octopus whilst other contain a foraminifer or a dead bird. All of the pictures are taken from the book Animals by Jim Harter. Some versions, including the Ukrainian edition, feature no artwork on the album label, and have inconsistent cover artwork from other versions.

Release
The album was released on March 11, 2003, through DreamWorks Records. In mid-to-late June and mid-to-late July, the group appeared on the Warped Tour.

Special limited edition 
A special limited edition was released that included the short film Clandestine on DVD, directed by Norwood Cheek. It also contained a 60-page booklet featuring extensive artwork and lyrics as well.

The film is eight minutes in length and stars all four band members. The film contains references to imagery and concepts from the album. The film focuses on the four band members trying to obtain a mysterious box which bears resemblance to the Sing the Sorrow album cover. The film features two playable soundtracks, one by bassist Hunter Burgan and the other by guitarist Jade Puget. Only 20,000 copies were pressed.

Reception 

Critical response to Sing the Sorrow was mostly very positive. The review aggregator Metacritic scored the album an 81 out of 100, based on 11 reviews, with the mention of "universal acclaim". E! Online called it a "well-crafted mix of hardcore bluster, determined melody and anthemic grandness that boasts depth and texture rarely heard from the Warped Tour ilk." Alternative Press awarded the album a perfect score, saying that, "Sing the Sorrow soars with the kind of melodies hit singles are made of, yet it somehow persists with AFI's esoteric darkness." Allmusic awarded the album 4 out of 5 stars and wrote: "Emerging in early 2003 with Sing the Sorrow, it's clear the molting process AFI began with Black Sails in Sunset is complete," and concluded that, "Whatever factions of the band's longterm fans might think of their major-label affiliation, Sing the Sorrow represents a coalescing of the band's sound." Rolling Stone awarded the album a 4 out of 5, claiming that "Sing the Sorrow is not exactly a concept album, but it does have a singleness of dark purpose that builds in momentum as the disc progresses." The New York Times rated Sing the Sorrow as the tenth-best album of 2003. Conversely, Entertainment Weekly gave the album a 'D', commenting that "The songs combine the most pretentious and overworked elements of their influences." The album ranked number 77 in the October 2006 issue of Guitar World magazine's List of the 100 Greatest Guitar Albums of All Time. The album's lead single, "Girl's Not Grey", received a 2003 VMA for the 'Best MTV2 Music Video' category. Alternative Press ranked "Girl's Not Grey" at number 63 on their list of the best 100 singles from the 2000s.

Singles 
Three singles, each with an accompanying music video, were released from Sing the Sorrow: "Girl's Not Grey", "The Leaving Song Pt. II," and "Silver and Cold." "Girl's Not Grey" was the highest-charting single, reaching No. 7 on the Billboard Alternative Songs chart, No. 33 on the Hot Mainstream Rock Tracks chart, and No. 22 on the UK Singles Chart. The second single, "The Leaving Song Pt. II" charted at No. 16 on the Alternative Songs chart, No. 31 on the Hot Mainstream Rock Tracks chart, No. 27 in Australia, and No. 43 in the UK. The third and final single, "Silver and Cold" reached No. 7 on the Alternative Songs chart and No. 39 on the Mainstream Rock Tracks chart.

Track listing

B-sides and outtakes 
All songs presumably recorded during the Sing the Sorrow sessions unless otherwise noted.

 "Reivers' Music" is featured on the DVD of the special limited edition album and the "Girl's Not Grey" single, as well as the 336 EP (2002), on which it backs the demo version of "Now the World".
 Demo versions of "Synesthesia", "This Celluloid Dream", "The Great Disappointment", "Paper Airplanes (makeshift wings)", "...But Home is Nowhere", "The Leaving Song", and "Now the World" can be found as b-sides on the album's single releases.
 "Rabbits are Roadkill on Rt. 37" was released on the MySpace Records: Volume 1 compilation in November 2005 and as a bonus track on the UK and Australian editions of Decemberunderground (2006).
 "Carcinogen Crush" was recorded during the Sing the Sorrow sessions, but the band felt that it did not fit the album. It was later re-recorded during the Decemberunderground sessions, but remained unreleased. It was eventually released as a bonus track on the video game Guitar Hero III: Legends of Rock (2007) and as a digital single on December 4, 2007. It was also featured on the "Medicate" UK vinyl and the Japanese version of Crash Love (2009). The Sing the Sorrow version remains unreleased.
 "100 Words" was not released until 2009 on the deluxe version of Crash Love.

Personnel 
Credits adapted from the album's booklet.

AFI
 Davey Havok – vocals, backing vocals, spoken word vocals
 Jade Puget – guitar, executive producer, programming, keyboards
 Hunter Burgan – bass guitar, backing vocals
 Adam Carson – drums, percussion, backing vocals

Additional musicians
 Susie Katayama – cello
 Roger Joseph Manning Jr. – additional keys on "...But Home is Nowhere"
 Anna-Lynne Williams – guest female vocal
 Jasmine Weist – Guest female vocal
 Nick 13 – additional backing vocals
 Geoff Kresge – additional backing vocals
 Chris Holmes – additional backing vocals
 Ralph Saenz – additional backing vocals
 Matt Wedgley – additional backing vocals
 Steve Cunningham – additional backing vocals
 St. Mileon's Church – choir
 Gibson Casian – spoken word vocals
 Hans Wold – spoken word vocals

Production
 Jerry Finn – producer, mixing, additional backing vocals
 Butch Vig – producer, additional backing vocals
 Joe McGrath – recording, additional backing vocals
 Chris Holmes – assistant engineer
 Alan Mason – assistant engineer
 Dan Chase – assistant engineer
 Stacey Dodds – assistant engineer, vocoder on "Death of Seasons"
 Alan Sanderson – assistant engineer
 Alan Mason – additional technical assistant
 Garner Knutsen – drum technician
 Mike Fasano – drum technician
 Brian Gardner – mastering
 Luke Wood – A&R, additional backing vocals
 Jason Noto – art direction, design
 Doug Cunningham – art direction, design
 Alan Forbes – icon illustration
 Matthew Welsh – photography

Certifications and chart positions

Weekly charts

Year-end charts

Certifications

Release history 

Standard edition

Special limited edition

Legacy 
In November 2022, the band announced that they would play the album in its entirety the first and only time at the Kia Forum in Los Angeles on March 11, 2023, the album's 20th anniversary. Jawbreaker, Chelsea Wolfe, and Choir Boy were slated to open the event. The band dedicated "Paper Airplanes (makeshift wings)" to Jawbreaker and "The Leaving Song" to album producer Jerry Finn, who died in 2008. Additionally, the out-of-print vinyl album was reissued for the anniversary.

References

Footnotes

Citations

External links 

AFI (band) albums
2003 albums
Albums produced by Butch Vig
Albums produced by Jerry Finn
2003 video albums
DreamWorks Records albums